The 1972 Belgian Open Championships was a men's tennis tournament staged at the Leopold Club in Brussels, Belgium that was part of the Grand Prix circuit and categorized as a Group C event. The tournament was played on outdoor clay courts and was held from 8 May until 4 May 1972. It was the sixth edition of the tournament and Manuel Orantes won the singles title.

Finals

Singles
 Manuel Orantes defeated  Andrés Gimeno 6–4, 6–1, 2–6, 7–5
 It was Orantes' 3rd singles title of the year and the 8th of his career in the Open Era.

Doubles
 Manuel Orantes /  Juan Gisbert Sr. and  Patricio Cornejo /  Jaime Fillol 9–7, 6–3

References

Belgian International Championships
Belgian International Championships
Belgian International Championships, 1972